Košarkaški klub FMP, commonly referred to as KK FMP, was a men's professional basketball club based in Belgrade, Serbia. The club played its home games at the 3,000 capacity Železnik Hall and have won the regional ABA League twice, in the 2003–04 and 2005–06 seasons.

In 2011, the club started cooperating with KK Crvena zvezda and competed under their name until 2015. In 2015, the club disbanded its senior team and changed the name to KK ILR Železnik. In 2013, Radnički FMP (formerly Radnički Novi Sad) adopted the name and the FMP logo, and renamed itself to KK FMP. However, not only according to the club's official website, but also according to the official website of the Adriatic League, this club still competes in the Adriatic League.

History

1975–1986: Early years
The club was established under the name KK ILR Železnik in 1975 on the joint initiative of the Ivo Lola Ribar Machine Factory (named after Yugoslav communist politician and military leader Ivo Lola Ribar) and the Železnik local community administrative board. Initially, the club was part of the Ivo Lola Ribar Sports Society, which, in addition to basketball, also fielded teams in football, handball, volleyball, boxing, bowling, archery, and chess.

During its beginnings, the club competed in the Belgrade Municipal League (Belgrade Zone), playing its home games on the outdoor concrete court belonging to the Braća Jerković Elementary School. Since the local league was ran in the spring-summer period, the club also entered the Belgrade Winter League in order to maintain the fitness level until the start of the next season. The new club was well-received by Železnik residents who often packed the small home court. Over time, as interest in basketball grew throughout the community, the club started developing a youth system by adding various age categories.

In the 1980s, the Železnik's senior squad starting posting notable results as the club progressed from the lower leagues. By the mid-1980s, they made it to Serbian Provincial League. However, with promotion to a higher level of competition, the operating costs also started rising. Unable to cover the costs of renting a basketball hall in which to compete, ILR Železnik effectively folded in 1986 as basketball activities ceased.

1991–2011: Years of success
The club was inactive until 1991 when it got reestablished under the name KK FMP Železnik on the initiative of the Fabrika metalnih proizvoda (Metal Products Factory), which became the club's owner. Almost immediately, the reestablished club continued where it had left-off in 1986. Following a season in the Second Serbian Provincial League, the club gained promotion to the First Provincial League. For the 1994–95 season, FMP Železnik made it to the YUBA B League, the 2nd-tier league in FR Yugoslavia. In this season, they won a top spot with only four losses, winning promotion to the YUBA League. On the club's 20th anniversary, in the 1995–96 season, FMP Železnik competed in the national top-tier league, finishing third the Group Three and gaining qualification into the second stage, the Championship League, where they finished ninth with a 19–17 record. In 1997, the club won its first major trophy, the Yugoslav Cup, after a 105–92 win over Partizan Inex in Niš. The club has never won a National League title, even they went into three finals (1996–97, 1997–98, 2002–03).

In the 2003–04 ABA season, the team, competing under the name KK Reflex, won the regional ABA League, defeating Croatian side Cibona in the final. Two years later, the club won another ABA title winning over Partizan in the Final. 

FMP played in the final of the 2011 Radivoj Korać Cup against Partizan, where they lost 77–73.

2011–2015: Agreement with Crvena zvezda
In August 2011, the club has reached a five-year agreement with KK Crvena zvezda after which the club used the Crvena zvezda's name, emblem, and colors in that period. The agreement stipulates that all the club's results within the specified period (including trophies) will be attributed to the Crvena zvezda. After this period, the contract stipulated that Crvena zvezda will continue where the FMP has left off.

In July 2015, Crvena zvezda became financially consolidate, and the agreement between the clubs ended a year before it was originally planned. In the meantime, KK Radnički Basket (formerly Radnički Novi Sad) changed its name to Radnički FMP and subsequently to KK FMP in 2013 with headquarters at the same address where the "original" FMP was based. Radnički FMP used the same team colors and partially modified logo, while "the original" FMP has changed its name to KK ILR Železnik and started competing with a youth system only.

Players

Retired numbers

Players in the NBA Draft

Coaches

 Momir Milatović  (1996–1998)
 Boško Đokić (1998)
 Aleksandar Petrović (1998–2001)
 Miodrag Baletić (2001–2002)
 Vlade Đurović (2002–2004)
 Boško Đokić (2004–2005)
 Vlada Vukoičić (2005–2008)
 Slobodan Klipa (2008)
 Milovan Stepandić (2008–2009)
 Slobodan Klipa (2009)
 Vlade Đurović (2009–2010)
 Boško Đokić (2010–2011)
 Aleksandar Petrović (2011)

Season-by-season

Trophies and awards

Trophies 
YUBA League
Runners-up (3) – 1996–97, 1997–98, 2002–03

Yugoslav Cup / Radivoj Korać Cup
Winners (4) – 1996–97, 2002–03, 2004–05, 2006–07
Runners-up (4) – 1998–99, 2003–04, 2009–10, 2010–11

Adriatic League
Winners (2) – 2003–04, 2005–06
Runners-up (1) – 2006–07

Notable players

  Nemanja Aleksandrov
  Ognjen Aškrabić
  Branko Cvetković
  Zoran Erceg
  Mile Ilić
  Dragan Labović
  Branko Jorović
  Dušan Kecman
  Branko Lazić
  Milan Mačvan
  Marko Marinović
  Dejan Milojević
  Veselin Petrović
  Bojan Popović
  Vuk Radivojević
  Vladimir Radmanović
  Miroslav Raduljica
  Aleksandar Rašić
  Duško Savanović
  Aleksandar Smiljanić 
  Miloš Teodosić
  Filip Videnov
  Guy Pnini
  Kimani Ffriend
  Predrag Samardžiski
  Goran Bošković 
  Nikola Bulatović
  Goran Nikolić
  Luka Pavićević
  Dejan Radonjić
  Mladen Šekularac
  Slavko Vraneš
  Chris Warren
  Reggie Freeman
  Brandon Bowman

International record

References

External links
 Official website 

Basketball teams in Belgrade
KK FMP (1991–2011)
Defunct basketball teams in Serbia
Basketball teams in Yugoslavia
Basketball teams established in 1975
Basketball teams established in 1991
Basketball teams disestablished in 2015
1975 establishments in Serbia
1991 establishments in Serbia